"Water Forest" is Japanese singer-songwriter Rurutia's second album under the Toshiba EMI label. The album reached to No. 226 on Oricon and charted for a week.

Track listing
 
 
 
 
 
  
  
 
 
 

2003 albums
Rurutia albums